The Diocese of Saldanha Bay is a diocese in the Anglican Church of Southern Africa.

The diocese was founded on 10 December 2005 and is based in the territory of the Diocese of Cape Town. Previously the area was served by a Regional Bishop of Saldanha within the Diocese of Cape Town, one of whom was Justus Marcus.

The Diocese was the first in the Anglican Church of Southern Africa to approve of the blessing of same-sex civil unions.

List of bishops
 Raphael Hess 2006–present

Sources
Desmond Tutu: Rabble-Rouser for Peace, by John Allen

References

External links
 Diocesan Website

2005 establishments in South Africa
Anglican Church of Southern Africa dioceses
Anglican bishops of Saldanha Bay